Palas is a tehsil and valley in Kolai-Palas District, Khyber Pakhtunkhwa the province of Pakistan.

Fauna 
Palas, Kohistan has incredible wildlife, it is home to the largest population of Western horned tragopan, Khalij, Koklass and Himalayan monal occur here, whereas the Cheer pheasant has been reintroduced here. There are 230 bird species in this tehsil. Mammals include carnivores such as the Persian leopard, Himalayan black bear and Red fox are found here. Ungulates such as the Himalayan goral, Himalayan musk deer and Wild boar are found here. For the protection of these species 1 national park, 3 wildlife sanctuaries and 5 game reserves have been established. Several surveys on other wildlife have also been compiled by experts including one on musk deer by Naeem Ashraf Raja.

References

External links 

Populated places in Lower Kohistan District
Union councils of Khyber Pakhtunkhwa
Tehsils of Khyber Pakhtunkhwa
Valleys of Khyber Pakhtunkhwa